Legalize Crime is the name of the debut EP by Outlaw Order (OO%), a side project of sludge metal band Eyehategod. It was released as a limited edition 7" (1,500 copies were printed) in 2003 and re-released on CD with a bonus live track on October 25, 2006. The reissue is  available through Eyehategod's webstore.

Track listing
"Byproduct of a Wrecked Society" (2:33)
"Delinquent Reich" (3:04)
"Illegal in 50 States" (2:08)
"D.B.S.E." (3:15)
"Worst Liar I Ever Met" (Live) (3:28)

"Worst Liar I Ever Met" is a bonus track on the CD reissue, and, according to Mike Williams, will never be recorded in a studio. "D.B.S.E." stands for "Double Barrel Solves Everything". Track 5 was recorded live on September 1, 2003 in New Orleans, Louisiana.

Credits
Mike Williams - vocals
Joey LaCaze - drums
Gary Mader - guitar
Marc Shultz - bass
Brian Patton - guitar
Chris George - recording

References

Outlaw Order albums
2003 EPs
Southern Lord Records EPs